Nguyễn Minh Tam (born 26 August 1950) is a Vietnamese former swimmer. She competed in the women's 100 metre freestyle at the 1968 Summer Olympics for South Vietnam. She was the first woman to represent South Vietnam at the Olympics.

References

External links
 

1950 births
Living people
Vietnamese female freestyle swimmers
Olympic swimmers of Vietnam
Swimmers at the 1968 Summer Olympics
Sportspeople from Ho Chi Minh City
21st-century Vietnamese women